Petnjik is a village in the municipality of Berane, Montenegro.

It is mainly inhabited by people with the Barjaktarović and Babović surnames, while there are inhabitants with surnames: Nedovic, Anđić, Marinković, etc. The centre of the village is about 4.5 km from Berane.

Demographics
According to the 2011 census, its population was 583.

References

Populated places in Berane Municipality
Serb communities in Montenegro